Raymond of Aguilers was a participant in and chronicler of the First Crusade (1096–1099). During the campaign he became the chaplain of Count Raymond IV of Toulouse, the leader of the Provençal army of crusaders. His chronicle, entitled Historia Francorum qui ceperunt Iherusalem, which he co-wrote with Pons of Balazun, ends with the events immediately following the capture of Jerusalem in 1099.

Everything we know about Raymond is derived from the Historia, the idea for which he credits to Pons. He must have been the main author and finisher, however, since Pons died before the capture of Jerusalem. The Historia was probably written as the crusade progressed and the preface added later. It was completed before the death of Count Raymond in 1105.

Raymond was probably born second half of the 11th century in the vicinity of Toulouse. "Aguilers" is probably a reference to the village of Aiguilhe. Before the crusade, Raymond was a lay canon (deacon) of the cathedral of Le Puy. He probably travelled originally in the entourage of Bishop Adhemar of Le Puy, the papal legate. There is a purported charter of Bishop Adhemar that refers to his chancellor as Raymond of Aguilhes, but the existence of this charter and the identification of the chancellor and the canon are doubtful. Raymond was ordained a priest during the Siege of Antioch in 1098 and afterwards was made a chaplain to Count Raymond and thus a member of his household.

Raymond was a man of simple piety. He reports that he was among the first to believe Peter Bartholomew's claim to have seen in a vision the location of the Holy Lance and that he participated in the digging that led to its discovery in the Church of Saint Peter. The authenticity of the Holy Lance and of Peter's visions is a major theme of his work, although he admits that Peter did not unambiguously pass the ordeal by fire. His account is partial to the Peasants' Crusade and takes a dim view of those who deserted or abandoned the expedition (and their vows). He had access to the Gesta Francorum, of which he made some use, and his Historia was used as a source by Fulcher of Chartres for the work he completed in 1101. Eschatological elements in his account may have been influenced by his access to the famed Le Puy Bible.

References

Further reading
Raymond d'Aguilers, Historia Francorum qui ceperunt Iherusalem tr. John Hugh Hill, Laurita L. Hill. Philadelphia: American Philosophical Society, 1968.
John H. Hill, "Raymond of St. Gilles in Urban's Plan of Greek and Latin Friendship," Speculum 26 (1951): 265-276

External links
Historia francorum qui ceperint Jerusalem Medieval Sourcebook, Fordham University

Christians of the First Crusade
11th-century French historians
11th-century Latin writers
Medieval writers about the Crusades
Crusades chaplains